William Farrar Weeks (February 22, 1859 - October 23, 1914) was coadjutor bishop of the Episcopal Diocese of Vermont from 1913 till 1914.

Early life and education
Weeks was born on February 22, 1859, in St. Albans, Vermont, the son of Joseph Seelye Weeks and Mary Elizabeth Farrar. He was educated at St. Albans High School and graduated in 1877. He later studied at Williams College, from where he graduated with a Bachelor of Arts in 1881. He enrolled at the General Theological Seminary, and graduated in 1884.

Ordained Ministry
Weeks was ordained deacon at St. Albans on October, 1884, and then priest on September 29, 1885, in St Matthew's Church, Enosburg Falls, Vermont, by Bishop William Henry Augustus Bissell of Vermont. After ordination he became rector of St Matthew's, the church in which he was ordained priest, and in 1889, became rector of St Thomas' Church in Brandon, Vermont. In 1894, he left for Shelburne, Vermont, to serve as rector of Trinity Church.

Bishop
On November 13, 1912, Weeks was elected Coadjutor Bishop of Vermont and was consecrated on January 29, 1913, at Burlington by Bishop Arthur C. A. Hall of Vermont. He died the following year on October 23 as a result of a prolonged illness of several months.

References 

 Williams College, Obituary Record of the Alumni (1915), pp. 251–252.

1859 births
1914 deaths
People from St. Albans, Vermont
Williams College alumni
19th-century American Episcopalians
Episcopal bishops of Vermont